Stephen Courtney Makanaka Bhasera (born ) is a Zimbabwean rugby union player playing in South Africa for the  in the Currie Cup and the  in the Rugby Challenge. His regular position is prop.

References

Zimbabwean rugby union players
Living people
1996 births
Sportspeople from Harare
Rugby union props
Golden Lions players